Naruka (Devnagari : नरुका or नरूका) is a clan of Rajputs found in India. Naruka Rajputs are offshoots of Maharao Naru Singh of Mozamabad, whose grandfather, Rao Bar Singh, gave up the throne of Amer kingdom. Rao Bar Singh was the eldest son of Raja Udaikarna of Amer. Naruka is the most prominent clan among Kachhwaha and holds an exceptional position in the history of India. They independently ruled on Alwar State.

Naruka Rajputs ruled a number of kingdoms and estates including Alwar, Lawa, Uniara, Javli, Beejwar, Ladana, Macheri, Rajgarh, Thanagazi, Dulrasar, Kakod, Banetha, Garhi, Khudeena, Para, Palwa, Bijnor, Srichandpura, Mehroon, etc. which lie in present-day Rajasthan.

Prominent Centres of Power

Alwar 

Rao Raja Shri Sawai Pratap Singh Naruka (1756-1790), by his valor, intelligence and political ability, made an independent kingdom after conquering parts of Bharatpur and Jaipur. The kingdom of Alwar was founded in 1770. Pratap Singh Naruka was the son of Rao Muhabbat Singh of Macheri, and was twelfth in descent from Rao Naru Singh of Mozamabad. While alive he adopted Bhakhtawar Singh as his son and successor to the throne of Alwar (then Macheri).

Uniara 

Uniara was founded by Rao Chandrabhan, who was fifth in descent from Rao Naru Singh of Mozamabad. The family initially hold the parganas of Uniara, Kakod, Nagar & Banetha.

Rao Chandrabhan showed his chivalry in Kandahar battle, fought in 1606 AD.

Rao Raja Sangram Singh, attacked the Mughal forces with his 500 war-trained dogs and 1500 Naruka warriors, which led to the victory of Rajputs against Mughals in the Battle of Sambhar (1708 AD).

In Uniara a distinctive branch of Dhundar paintings flourished which came to be known as Uniara Paintings.

Lawa & Ladana 

Thakur Kesri Singh, Thakur of Ladana, ninth in descent from Rao Naru Singh of Mozamabad, was made the jagirdar of Ladana by the then ruler of Jaipur. He married and had issue, two sons. Thakur Sawant Singh, succeeded his father and became head of the Ladana Thikana. Thakur Nahar Singh was granted the estate of Lawa by the ruler of Jaipur in the year 1722 AD.

Nawab Amir Khan Pindari plundered territories of Jaipur State and Jodhpur State several times. He was defeated by Kunwar Bharat Singh Naruka of Ladana at the Madhorajpura Fort.

The sturdy thakurs of Lawa refused to accept the sovereignty of newly carved Tonk State. Gopaldan Kaviya in his book Lawa Raso mentions the two major wars fought between Lawa and Tonk. Thakur Dhirut Singh acceded to the throne of Lawa in 1865 AD. His uncle Thakur Rewut Singh of Lawa was a commander in the Alwar State forces. In 1867, Rewut Singh was treacherously murdered by Nawab of Tonk. Following this, Lawa was declared a separate chiefship under British protection and, Nawab of Tonk was deposed from his throne.

Jawli 
Gaj Singh Naruka was the first Rao of Jawli. In January 1710, he defeated combined armies of Mughals and Jats during Rajput Rebellion. After the formation of Alwar kingdom by Rao Raja Pratap Singh, the Naruka chief of Jawli shifted their allegiance to Alwar kingdom.

Architecture

Alwar City Palace 
City Palace of Alwar, also known as Vinay Vilas Mahal, built by Maharaja Bhaktawar Singh in 1793 AD. It is an architectural marvel with a lovely mix of Mughal and Rajputana styles. Jai Pol, Suraj Pol, Laxman Pol, Chand Pol, Kishan Pol and Andheri Gate are some of the entry gates. Beyond the gate lies an open ground with Krishna temples on all four sides. On the walls and ceiling of the palace, there is a fabulous collection of murals and mirror work can be seen. The City Museum, located on the upper floors of the Palace has a splendid range of miniature paintings of the Alwar School.

Sariska Palace 

The Sariska Palace built by Maharaja Jai Singh of Alwar on the edge of Sariska National Park as a royal hunting lodge. The interiors of Sariska Palace is a blend of French and regal architecture. This palace was used in the Bollywood movie Karan Arjun (1995) as "Thakur Durjan Singh ki haveli".

Moosi Maharani Chhatri 

Indo-Islamic style of the cenotaph built in honor of Maharaja Bakhtawar Singh (1791-1815 AD) and his queen, Rani Moosi, can be observed throughout. It is made up of red sandstone within the lower portion, with domed arches and columns and marble in the upper part. The monument is considered one of the most impressive examples of its type around the globe.

Silisereh Lake Palace 

Silisereh Lake Palace, located 15 kilometres to the southwest of Alwar, this tranquil lake is nestled amidst forested hills and boasts of magnificent cenotaphs on its bank. In 1845, Maharaja Vinay Singh constructed a hunting chalet here for his Queen, Shila.

The Siliserh Lake Residence, formerly an imperial palace and hunting lodge, is now a hotel of the past run by RTDC situated on the banks of the lake.

Fort Sites 
The most prominent forts built by Naruka kings include:
Niwai Fort (in present-day Tonk, built in 15th or 16th century)
 Mundota Fort (in present-day Jaipur, built in 14th century, later went to Nathawats)
 Kakor Fort (in present-day Tonk, built in 17th century by Naruka kings of Uniara)
 Rajgarh Fort (in present-day Alwar, built by Rao Raja Pratap Singh Naruka in 18th century)

Paintings

Uniara School of Painting 

Sangram Singh I, Ajit Singh, Sardar Singh and Bishan Singh, were instrumental in promoting an art form which became known as Uniara art style. It had three distinctive phases. Sardar Singh had at his court three artists, Dhima, Mir Buksh and Kashi, who preferred a style which assimilated elements of Jaipur and Bundi school. The courts of Bundi and Uniara were linked by marriage, (Sardar Singh's daughter was married to Dalel Singh of Bundi) and perhaps as a result, the painting style of Uniara was strongly influenced by Bundi. The earliest recorded work at Uniara is a Bhagavata Purana of 1759, and it seems that artistic production increased after the Mughal Emperor Shah Alam gave the title of Rao Raja to Sardar Singh the same year.

Alwar School of Painting 
The Alwar school of painting flourished from the time the founder of the princely state of Alwar, Rao Raja Pratap Singh, made Rajgarh his capital in 1775 until the end of the reign of the then Maharaja Jai Singh (1892–1937). In this period, the names of Daluram, Baldev, Saligaram, Jamandas, Chote Lal, Baksaram and Nandaram are notable among the artists who enriched painting with their excellent art works.

It includes a range of the incarnations of Lord Vishnu and a Ragamala series, as well as pictures of the Alwar royal family. Krishna Lila, Ram Lila, religious conversation with saints in natural surrounding, Raag-Ragini's had been extensively painted. The Alwar style attained diversity with regard to themes.

Notable Members
 Rao Raja Pratap Singh Naruka, founder of Alwar Kingdom
 Maharaja Jai Singh Naruka, former king of Alwar
 Gaj Singh Naruka of Javli, defeated Mughal-Jat alliance during Rajput Rebellion
 Bharat Singh Naruka of Ladana, defeated Nawab of Tonk, Amir Khan Pindari
 Digvijay Singh Uniara, served as the Home Minister, the Minister of Agriculture and remained M.L.A. for 6 times from Uniara constituency
 Jitendra Singh Alwar, served as the Minister of State for Youth Affairs and Sports (Independent charge) and the Minister of State for Defence, Government of India
 Ajay Singh Naruka, former Speaker of Indore Municipal Corporation
 Ashok Naruka, retired IPS officer of Rajasthan Cadre, served as DIG of Police (CID CB) and lastly as Deputy IGP (Intelligence) 
 Bhuvneshwari Kumari, recipient of Padma Shri and Arjun Award, former Indian squash player
 Shilpa Naruka, Indian tennis player 
 Anantjeet Singh Naruka, national skeet shooter

References

Rajputs